Integrated Design Associates (IDA) is a Hong Kong-based architectural firm set up in 1999 by its founder and principal, Winston Shu. The company is known for their sustainable, "green" designs, and their main body of work comprises international airports.

Concept, completed and future projects

Transportation

 Male International Airport, Maldives (projected 2014)
 Hanimaadhoo International Airport, Maldives (concept design)
 Rajiv Gandhi International Airport, Hyderabad, India (2008)
 Departure Kerb Canopy, Hong Kong International Airport, Hong Kong (2008)
 Jinan International Airport, Jinan, China (2005)
 Hong Kong International Airport Improvement Works, Hong Kong (2002)
 Beijing Capital International Airport, Beijing, China (concept design 2004)
 Shanghai Pu Dong International Airport Phase II, Shanghai, China (concept design)
 Shenzhen Bao An International Airport, Shenzhen, China (concept design)
 Dalian International Airport, Dalian, China (concept design)
 Shenzhen MTR, Shenzhen, China (concept design)
 Hong Kong Heliport, Hong Kong (2008)
 Indira Gandhi International Airport, Delhi, India (2010)
 Hong Kong Heliport, Hong Kong (2008)
 Mactan–Cebu International Airport Terminal 2, Cebu, Philippines (2018)

Retail, commercial, hotel

 Parkview Green (Hotel), Beijing, China (2012)
 Durban's Taichung Project, Taiwan (concept design)

Office

 Parkview Green (Office), Beijing, China (2012)
 The Cameron, 33 Cameron Road, Hong Kong (2008)
 Nortel Wangjing Campus, Beijing, China (2006)
 Sinochem Head Office, Beijing, China (2002)
 Shanghai North Bund Huishan Office Towers B1 & B2, Shanghai, China

Institutional

 ESF Discovery College, Discovery Bay, Hong Kong (2008)
 Hong Kong Housing Authority Exhibition Centre, Hong Kong (2001)

Residential

 One LaSalle, Kowloon Tong, Hong Kong (2008)

Industrial

 Hong Kong Business Aviation Centre Hangar, Hong Kong (2007)
 ISA Tianjin Technology Park, Tianjin, China (2007)

Awards
 HKIA Merit Award Outside Hong Kong 2012 - Parkview Green
 Green Building Award Grand Award 2012 - Parkview Green
 International Green Awards 2011 - Parkview Green
 FuturArc Green Leadership Award 2011 - Parkview Green
 WAF Future Project of the Year 2011 - Hanimaadhoo Airport
 WAF Future Project Infrastructure 2011 - Hanimaadhoo Airport
 Perspective Awards Certificate of Excellence 2011 - Parkview Green
 AIA Merit Award 2010 - Hanimaadhoo Airport
 MIPIM Asia Green Building Award 2010 - Parkview Green
 AIA Merit Award for Un-built Project 2010 - Hanimaadhoo Airport
 Quality Building Award Finalist of Residential Category 2010 - One LaSalle
 Hong Kong Institute of Engineers Structural Excellence Award - ESF Discovery College
 LEED Platinum 2009 - Parkview Green
 Top 5 Best Airports Worldwide (Multiple Years) - Rajiv Gandhi International Airport
 AIA Merit Award for Interior Design 2002 - Hong Kong Housing Authority Exhibition Centre
 AIA Honor Award for Un-built Project 2001 - Shenzhen MTR Depot and Office Building

References

Architecture firms of Hong Kong